Hussein Gaber Ibrahim (born 1 January 1999 in Djibouti) is a Djiboutian swimmer. He competed in the men's 50m freestyle event at the 2020 Summer Olympics.

References

Living people
1999 births
Swimmers at the 2020 Summer Olympics
Djiboutian male swimmers
Olympic swimmers of Djibouti